The United States Citizenship and Immigration Services (USCIS) issues a number of forms for people to submit to them relating to immigrant and non-immigrant visa statuses. These forms begin with the letter "I". None of the forms directly grants a United States visa (visas can only be issued by US consulates outside the United States), but approval of these forms may provide authorization for staying or extending one's stay in the United States as well as authorization for work. Some United States visas require an associated approved USCIS immigration form to be submitted as part of the application.

Although the term immigration form is used on this page, and the forms begin with the letter "I", many of the forms pertain to non-immigrant visa classifications.

The USCIS also issues some administrative request forms (AR) for purposes such as address change as well as G forms for other administrative purposes. The AR and G forms are generally filed in conjunction with a USCIS I form. The two most important G forms are the G-28 (notice of entry or appearance of attorney) and the G-1145 (e-notification of application/petition acceptance).

The USCIS also handles forms related to naturalization and citizenship. These forms begin with the letter "N" and are not discussed on this page.

There are two main forms that begin with the letter I and pertain to immigration status but are not managed by USCIS: Form I-20 (issued by educational institutions to students on a F visa status) and Form I-94 (issued by United States Customs and Border Protection when an alien enters the United States).

Filing details

Fees

All USCIS forms are free to download. The filing fees vary by form, from free to several hundred dollars.

The filing fee for a form may not be the only fee that needs to be paid for the status being sought on the form. There may be additional fees associated with that status. For instance, Form I-129 is used to apply for H-1B status (among many other statuses); there are several additional fees associated with H-1B status.

Two of the forms, Form I-129 and Form I-140, are eligible for the Premium Processing Service, which requires the filing of Form I-907. As of December 2021, this services costs $1,500 for the H-2B and R classifications and $2,500 for all others.

Some applicants are eligible for a fee waiver. To apply for a fee waiver, the applicant must submit Form I-912, Request for a Fee Waiver, along with the application form.

Fees paid for USCIS immigration forms are deposited in the Immigration Examinations Fee Account (IEFA) managed by the United States Treasury; this account funds most of the USCIS budget.

Paper filing

All USCIS forms can be filed on paper. Payments must be included in the form of a check or money order along with the paper filing of the form.

The rules associated with where forms are to be mailed are complex: the location for mailing a form depends on the form name, the category of application, and the mailing address specified by the applicant (this may differ from the address the applicant sends the application from). The mailing address is either one of the lockbox addresses or one of the Service Center addresses. The lockboxes are in three US cities: Chicago (Illinois), Phoenix (Arizona), and Lewisville (Texas) (this is near Dallas, Texas and is often referred to as the Dallas lockbox). They are managed for the USCIS by a Department of Treasury designated financial agent. The lockbox cashes in on the included payment, sends an e-notification if the applicant filed Form G-1145 with the application, and forwards the rest of the application to the service center.

Any response to a Request For Evidence (RFE) or Notice of Intent to Deny (NOID) must always be sent to the Service Center that sent the request, and never to a lockbox address, regardless of whether or not the original application was filed with a lockbox.

Electronic filing

Some of the USCIS forms may be filed electronically via e-Filing (for Forms I-131, I-140, I-765, I-821, and I-907) or the USCIS Electronic Immigration System (USCIS ELIS) (for Forms I-526, I-539, I-90, or the Immigrant Fee).

Electronic filing offers the following benefits:

 It reduces the hassle and cost of filing a paper application (but see the caveat below).
 Fees may be paid by debit card or credit card.
 The applicant receives an immediate confirmation of receipt of the application.

However, there are two major caveats:

 Supporting documents must be sent in by mail within 7 days of online filing, to the address specified on the e-Filing Confirmation Receipt. USCIS does not begin processing the application until all supporting documents are received. If they are not received then USCIS may send the applicant a request for evidence (RFE).
 If the applicant is requesting a fee waiver (filing Form I-912) then the application cannot be submitted online and must be filed on paper.

To enhance privacy and security for applicants, USCIS uses the HTTPS protocol for e-filing.

Forms

The two main kinds of forms are:

 Petition forms: Here, a petitioner files a form requesting a benefit (associated with an immigrant status or non-immigrant status) for a beneficiary. The beneficiary is usually distinct from the petitioner, though there are some self-petition categories. Petition forms generally carry the most uncertainty regarding approval, and some of them are subject to quotas.
 Application forms: These include application forms related to entry to the United States, leaving to the United States, and work authorization in the United States. The benefits being sought here are generally governed by clearer frameworks of rules, and carry less uncertainty than petition forms.

In addition, there are affidavits (such as Form I-134, Affidavit of Support) verification forms (Form I-9, Employee Eligibility Verification Form), and request forms, such as Form I-907, Request for Premium Processing Service.

Family-based petition forms

Other petition forms (employment-based, entrepreneurial, and special)

Application forms

There are many application forms. Only the most important ones are listed below.

Appeal forms

These are the forms that need to be filed to appeal a decision by a USCIS officer regarding another form. The appeal form must be filed by the party that filed the original form. In particular, in the case of a petition, the appeal must be filed by the petitioner and cannot be filed by the beneficiary (if distinct from the petitioner). Appeals are handled by the Board of Immigration Appeals within the  Executive Office for Immigration Review (part of the Department of Justice) and the Administrative Appeals Office within the USCIS. BIA's main role is for challenges to U.S. Immigration and Customs Enforcement decisions, but it is also used to appeal some USCIS forms.

Of the USCIS immigration forms, decisions on the two forms Form I-130 (family-based immigration, the F and IR categories) and the widower subcategory for Form I-360 (special immigrants, the EB-4 category), must be appealed through the EOIR-29 (Notice of Appeal to the Board of Immigration Appeals from a Decision of an Immigration Officer) to the Board of Immigration Appeals. Also, appeals for denials of Form N-400 (the naturalization petition) must be made using Form N-336. For Special Agricultural Worker (SAW) or legalization applications, the appeal must be filed on Form I-694, Notice of Appeal of Decision under Sections 245A or 210 of the Immigration and Nationality Act.

For all other USCIS petitions where appeal is possible, the petitioner can appeal an adverse USCIS decision on the petition to the AAO using Form I-290B, Notice of Appeal or Motion.

As of December 2016, appeal to AAO is possible for the following petition forms: I-129 (nonimmigrant worker), I-140 (immigrant worker), I-526 (immigrant investor), Form I-821, I-129F, I-601, I-212, I-360, I-600, I-600A, I-914, I-918, N-470. As of December 2016, there are no appeal rights for Form I-485 (Adjustment of Status)

There is no standalone appeals process for Form I-765.

The form is usually applied for in conjunction with another form that grants the underlying authorization, and a denial of the other form can be appealed.

Form I-797
Form I-797 is a form used by the USCIS to issue approval of status or notice of receipt for applications. It is not a form that people can fill out.

Form-filling guidelines

The USCIS website includes a number of tips for people filing USCIS forms, including suggestions to download the latest version from the website, use black ink, and start with a clean form in case of errors. All supporting documents must be included in the application, and documents not in English must include a certified English translation.

Law resource NOLO emphasizes the importance of filling in all fields, even if it's filled with "N/A", and being accurate and consistent. NOLO also places emphasis on getting one's name correct.

See also 

 USCIS processing times
 Direct Consular Filing
 Premium Processing Service

References

United States government forms
Immigration forms